The purplish jay (Cyanocorax cyanomelas) is a species of bird in the family Corvidae.
It is found in northern Argentina, Bolivia, southern Brazil, Paraguay and southeastern Peru.
Its natural habitats are subtropical or tropical dry forest, subtropical or tropical moist lowland forest, and heavily degraded former forest.

References

purplish jay
Birds of Bolivia
Birds of Paraguay
Birds of the Pantanal
purplish jay
Taxa named by Louis Jean Pierre Vieillot
Taxonomy articles created by Polbot